The 1933–34 Wyoming Cowboys basketball team represented the University of Wyoming during the 1933–34 NCAA men's basketball season in the United States. The head coach was Willard Witte, coaching in his fourth season with the Cowboys. The team finished the season with a 26–4 record and were named national champions by the Helms Athletic Foundation.

Schedule and results

|-
!colspan=9| Regular season

Source

References

Wyoming Cowboys basketball seasons
Wyoming
NCAA Division I men's basketball tournament championship seasons
Wyoming Cowboys Basketball Team
Wyoming Cowboys Basketball Team